The 2009 Virginia Cavaliers men's soccer team represented the University of Virginia during the 2009 NCAA Division I men's soccer season. It was the Cavaliers' 69th season fielding a men's varsity soccer program, and the program's 56th season playing in the Atlantic Coast Conference.

The Cavaliers had one of their most successful seasons in program history, winning both the ACC Men's Soccer Tournament, and the NCAA Division I Men's Soccer Tournament. The Cavs won their first ACC Tournament title since 2004, and their first NCAA Tournament title since 1994. It was head coach George Gelnovatch's first year winning the NCAA title. Altogether, it was the Cavs' sixth national championship season. Additionally, the Cavs won the minor early season Portland/Nike Invitational. The Cavaliers also finish first in the National Soccer Coaches Association of America rankings for the first time since 1994.

Background 
The Cavaliers came off a season where they finished 11–9–1 across all competitions and 4–4 in ACC play. The Cavaliers finished fourth in the ACC and earned an berth into the ACC Men's Soccer Tournament. Virginia reached the ACC Championship where they lost to eventual NCAA champions, Maryland, 1–0. Their run in the ACC Tournament secured an at-large bid into the 2008 NCAA Division I Men's Soccer Tournament seeded 10th, ensuring a second round bye. Virginia lost in the Second Round of the tournament to Connecticut, 2–0.

Roster

Schedule 

|-
!colspan=6 style="background:#041E42; color:#FFFFFF; border:2px solid #FA4616;"| Preseason
|-

|-
!colspan=6 style="background:#041E42; color:#FFFFFF; border:2px solid #FA4616;"| Regular season
|-

|-
!colspan=6 style="background:#041E42; color:#FFFFFF; border:2px solid #FA4616;"| ACC Tournament
|-

|-
!colspan=6 style="background:#041E42; color:#FFFFFF; border:2px solid #FA4616;"| NCAA Tournament
|-

Rankings

See also 
Virginia Cavaliers men's soccer

References

External links 
 2009 Virginia Cavaliers Men's Soccer Results and Releases

Virginia Cavaliers
Virginia Cavaliers men's soccer seasons
Virginia Cavaliers, Soccer
Virginia Cavaliers
NCAA Division I Men's Soccer Tournament College Cup seasons
NCAA Division I Men's Soccer Tournament-winning seasons
2009